Dro Trisu Ramsha (? – ?) was a general of Tibetan Empire. He was a "Shang" (imperial affine) of Tibet Emperor.

He conquered the Kingdom of Khotan in 790. After the death of Nanam Shang Gyaltsen Lhanang, he was appointed as the Lönchen.

References
Old Tibetan Chronicle, P.T. 1287

8th-century Tibetan people
People of the Tibetan Empire